Saint Alan or Saint Alain may refer to:
 
 Alain de la Roche (1428–1475), or Alanus de Rupe, canonized saint, "Alan of the Rock" 
 Alain de Solminihac (1593–1659), French Catholic religious reformer and bishop of Cahors
 Alan of Lavaur, to whom Lavaur Cathedral is dedicated
 Alain of Quimper, medieval Breton saint